La Mia Vita Violenta (Italian for "My Violent Life") is the second studio album by American alternative rock band Blonde Redhead. It was released in September 1995 by Smells Like Records.

Track listing

Personnel
Credits are adapted from the liner notes of La Mia Vita Violenta and the 2016 compilation album Masculin Féminin.

Blonde Redhead
 Kazu Makino – guitar, vocals
 Amedeo Pace – guitar, vocals
 Simone Pace – drums
 Maki Takahashi – bass

Additional musicians
 Tada Hirano – keyboard on "(I Am Taking Out My Eurotrash) I Still Get Rocks Off" and "I Am There While You Choke on Me"
 Tombi Thokchom – sitar on "Harmony"

Production

 Blonde Redhead – production
 Edward Douglas – recording
 John Siket – mixing
 Mark Venezia – recording

Design

 Stefano Giovannini – photography (band photograph)
 John Kelsey – cover design
 Carissa Rodriguez – cover design

References

External links
 
 

1995 albums
Blonde Redhead albums